Enrico Bianchi (born 13 May 1930) is a Swiss rower who competed in the 1952 Summer Olympics and in the 1960 Summer Olympics. He was born in Chur. In 1952 he was a crew member of the Swiss boat which won the silver medal in the coxed four event. Eight years later he was part of the Swiss boat which was eliminated in the repêchage of the eight competition.

References

1930 births
Living people
Swiss male rowers
Olympic rowers of Switzerland
Rowers at the 1952 Summer Olympics
Rowers at the 1960 Summer Olympics
Olympic silver medalists for Switzerland
Olympic medalists in rowing
People from Chur
Medalists at the 1952 Summer Olympics
European Rowing Championships medalists
Sportspeople from Graubünden